Matt Joe Gow (born in Auckland, New Zealand) is a musician and singer-songwriter and also the lead singer and frontman of Australian Americana band Matt Joe Gow & The Dead Leaves.  Joe Gow released his debut album The Messenger (Matt Joe Gow and the Dead Leaves album) through Liberation Music to critical acclaim.  His follow up album Seven Years released in 2016 was nominated for a Victoria Music Award for Best Country Album and his third solo album titled Break Rattle And Roll released in October 2018 won the award for Best Country Album.

Discography

Albums

Awards and nominations

Music Victoria Awards
The Music Victoria Awards are an annual awards night celebrating Victorian music. They commenced in 2006.

! 
|-
| Music Victoria Awards of 2016
| Seven Years
| Best Country Album
| 
|rowspan="2"| 
|-
| Music Victoria Awards of 2019
| Break, Rattle and Roll
| Best Country Album
| 
|-

References

Sources 
 
 http://alsmusicrant.blogspot.com.au/2012/02/whats-will-all-of-this-living-interview.html
 http://www.newshub.co.nz/entertainment/the-dead-leaves-interview-2012032911#axzz46t8Jhjkd
 http://www.soundsofoz.com/2016/09/23/seven-years-matt-joe-gow/
 http://music.theaureview.com/news/the-age-music-victoria-awards-open-public-voting-as-2017-nominees-are-unveiled/
 https://www.rrr.org.au/explore/news-articles/winners-of-the-2019-music-victoria-awards
 https://www.stuff.co.nz/entertainment/music/129472257/i-fell-back-in-love-with-the-place-kiwi-muso-back-touring-smalltown-new-zealand
 https://www.muzic.net.nz/articles/reviews/93667/gig-review-matt-joe-gow-wine-cellar-auckland-21082022
 The Messenger (Matt Joe Gow and the Dead Leaves album)

Living people
New Zealand male guitarists
New Zealand pianists
New Zealand male singer-songwriters
Musicians from Dunedin
Male pianists
21st-century pianists
21st-century New Zealand male singers
Year of birth missing (living people)